"Netflix" is a song by American rapper 2 Chainz from his second studio album B.O.A.T.S. II: Me Time. (2013) The song was released as the album's second promotional single on August 26, 2013. It was produced by Da Honorable C.N.O.T.E., Diplo and DJA and featured a guest appearance by Fergie. The song peaked on the US Billboard Bubbling Under R&B/Hip-Hop Singles at number six.

Background 
On August 26, 2013, 2 Chainz premiered "Netflix" featuring Fergie, from his second studio album B.O.A.T.S. II: Me Time.
On the same day, it was serviced to DJs as the album's second promotional single.

Chart performance

Release history

References 

2013 songs
2 Chainz songs
Fergie (singer) songs
Song recordings produced by Diplo